Hadriania may refer to :

 Hadriania (Mysia), an Ancient city and former bishopric in Asia Minor, now a Latin Catholic titular see
 Hadriania (gastropod), a genus of sea snails